Sangyuan is a town and the county seat of Wuqiao County, Hebei Province of the People's Republic of China. Sangyuan covers an area of 37.4 square kilometers with a population of 45,400 and 9 communities and 33 villages under its jurisdiction. , it has 8 residential communities and 33 villages under its administration.

References

Township-level divisions of Hebei
Wuqiao County